Frederike Migom (born 1985), is a Belgian actress, screenwriter and director. She is best known for the award-winning films Binti, Nkosi coiffure and Malakim.

Personal life
Migom was born in 1985 in Antwerp, Belgium. After moving to New York at the age of 17, she completed her education at the American Academy of Dramatic Arts in New York. Then at the age of 21 she moved to Paris and studied filmmaking at the École supérieure d'études cinématographiques in Paris. After completing the studies, she returned to her motherland and settled in Brussels at the age of 24.

Career
She started her career as an actress where she made her film debut with Miss Homeless in 2009. In 2010, she worked as the second assistant director for the film First Mission and then in Smoorverliefd as the third assistant director. In the preceding year, she held several posts in the film production crew such as production intern, post-production coordinator and assistant producer after moved to Brussels in 2011 and worked in film production for Caviar in Brussels. In 2012, she made the television acting debut with the serial The Out-Laws and played the role "Bloemiste". In 2013, she directed her first short film, Malakim. Then she made the shorts Adam & Everything in 2014 and Nkosi Coiffure in 2015.

In 2015, she directed the short film Nkosi Coiffure where it received critics acclaim and screened at the Tribeca Film Festival and the BFI London Film Festival. In 2017, she directed a short documentary, Si-G. In 2019, she made her maiden feature fiml Binti. The film made North-American premiere at the Sundance Film Festival 2020, and later screened at about 45 festivals worldwide. In the meantime, the film received positive critics acclaim and won several awards including: the ECFA award for Best European Film for young audiences 2020 and the Golden Lion at Cinekid in 2019.  

In 2020, Frederike co-wrote and directed an episode for the mini-series Lockdown for the Flemish television. Then in the end of same year, she wrote and directed the short documentary Angry. In 2021, she started her second feature film Tegenwoordig heet iedereen with the support of the Flemish Audiovisual Fund (VAF).

Filmography

References

External links
 

Living people
Belgian film directors
1985 births